David Laly (born 7 November 1992) is an Indonesian professional footballer who plays as a winger for Liga 1 club RANS Nusantara.

Club career

Pelita Bandung Raya
He signed a contract with Pelita Bandung Raya on 18 November 2013. Laly made his debut on 1 February 2014 in a match against Persita Tangerang. On 26 May 2014, Laly scored his first goal for Pelita Bandung Raya against Persegres Gresik United in the 16th minute at the Si Jalak Harupat Stadium, Soreang, Bandung.

Persib Bandung
On January 21, 2016, he signed a one-year contract with Persib Bandung on a free transfer, alongside his club teammates Rachmad Hidayat and Kim Kurniawan.

Barito Putera
In the 2017 season, he signed a one-year contract with PS Barito Putera. Laly made his debut on 15 April 2014 in a match against Mitra Kukar. On 18 July 2017, Laly scored his first goal for Barito Putera against PSM Makassar in the 73rd minute at the Andi Mattalatta Stadium, Makassar.

Felcra FC
In January 2018, he signed a one-year contract with Malaysia Premier League club Felcra. He made his first-team debut for Felcra after starting the 2018 Malaysia Premier League match against PDRM F.A. on 2 February 2018, in which Felcra drew 1–1.

Madura United
He was signed for Madura United to play in Liga 1 in the 2019 season. David Laly made his debut on 17 May 2019 in a match against Persela Lamongan. On 16 August 2018, Laly scored his first goal for Madura United against Persija Jakarta in the 48th minute at the Gelora Madura Stadium, Pamekasan.

RANS Nusantara
Laly was signed for RANS Nusantara to play in Liga 1 in the 2022–23 season. He made his league debut on 23 July 2022 in a match against PSIS Semarang at the Jatidiri Stadium, Semarang.

Honours

Club
Persipura Jayapura
Indonesian Community Shield: 2009
Indonesia Super League: 2010–11
Indonesian Inter Island Cup: 2011
SCTV CUP: 2011
Felcra
 Malaysia Premier League runner-up: 2018

International
Indonesia U-23
Islamic Solidarity Games  Silver medal: 2013

References

External links
 

1992 births
Living people
Indonesian footballers
Papuan people
People from Wamena
Sportspeople from Papua
Liga 1 (Indonesia) players
Malaysia Premier League players
Association football midfielders
Indonesian expatriate footballers
Expatriate footballers in Malaysia
Indonesian expatriate sportspeople in Malaysia
Persipura Jayapura players
Persidafon Dafonsoro players
Pelita Bandung Raya players
Felcra FC players
Persib Bandung players
Madura United F.C. players
PS Barito Putera players
RANS Nusantara F.C. players